Kolbjörn Knudsen (13 October 1897 – 8 January 1967) was a Swedish actor. He appeared in more than 30 films between 1928 and 1967.

Selected filmography

 Sin (1928)
 Charlotte Löwensköld (1930)
 Conflict (1937)
 General von Döbeln (1942)
 Life in the Country (1943)
 Young Blood (1943)
 I Killed (1943)
 I Am Fire and Air (1944)
 Prince Gustaf (1944)
 The Girl and the Devil (1944)
 Black Roses (1945)
 The Girls in Smaland (1945)
 Rail Workers (1947)
 Love Wins Out (1949)
 Love (1952)
 The Road to Klockrike (1953)
 No Man's Woman (1953)
 Wild Birds (1955)
 When the Mills are Running (1956)
 No Tomorrow (1957)
 Synnöve Solbakken (1957)
 Winter Light (1963)

References

External links

1897 births
1967 deaths
Norwegian emigrants to Sweden
Swedish male film actors
Actors from Bergen